Ellen Lucille Bree Burns (December 13, 1923 – June 3, 2019) was a United States district judge of the United States District Court for the District of Connecticut.

Education and career

Burns was born in New Haven, Connecticut. She received a Bachelor of Arts degree from Albertus Magnus College in 1944. She received a Bachelor of Laws from Yale Law School in 1947. She was a special assistant to the Commission to Revise the Connecticut General Statutes from 1947 to 1948. She was an attorney for Legislative Legal Services of the State of Connecticut from 1949 to 1973. She was a judge of the Circuit Court of Connecticut from 1973 to 1974. She was a judge of the Court of Common Pleas, Connecticut from 1974 to 1976. She was a judge of the Superior Court of Connecticut from 1976 to 1978.

Federal judicial service

Burns was nominated by President Jimmy Carter on February 15, 1978, to a seat on the United States District Court for the District of Connecticut vacated by Judge Mosher Joseph Blumenfeld. She was confirmed by the United States Senate on May 17, 1978 and received her commission on May 18, 1978, becoming the first female district judge in Connecticut. She served as Chief Judge from 1988 to 1992 and assumed senior status on September 1, 1992. She took inactive senior status on March 31, 2015, meaning that while she remained a federal judge, she no longer heard cases or participated in the business of the court. She died on June 3, 2019, aged 95.

References

Sources
 
  Who's Who of International Women 2002

1923 births
2019 deaths
Albertus Magnus College alumni
Yale Law School alumni
Judges of the United States District Court for the District of Connecticut
United States district court judges appointed by Jimmy Carter
20th-century American judges
Lawyers from New Haven, Connecticut
Superior court judges in the United States
Connecticut state court judges
20th-century American women judges